Sindhanur is a city and taluk headquarter of  Sindhanur taluk in Raichur District in  Karnataka. It is the main commercial center of the district. River Tungabhadra covers the irrigation area by left bank canal. Most of the land in the field is composed of cultivable black soil. Paddy is cultivated using the Tungabhadra River water. sindhanur is also known as the Paddy Granary of  Raichur. With the availability of Tungabhadra river water, paddy is grown twice a year. Sindhanur is the place with Most of the tractor sales take place in Asia. as agricultural activities take place year-round. Sona Masuri and Basmati rice are grown in Sindhanur. Most interesting thing about sindhanur is that there is Bengali camp (RH Colony NO 2 3 4 5) famous village where all are Bengali speaking Hindus they celebrate Durga Pooja during ever year October month.

Demographics
As of 2001 India census, Sindhnur (Rural) had a population of 12,666 with 6,504 males and 6,162 females.

See also
 Raichur
 Districts of Karnataka

References

External links
 http://Raichur.nic.in/

Villages in Raichur district